Russell Wheeler Davenport (1899 – April 19, 1954) was an American editor, political consultant, and writer.

Early life and education
Davenport was born in Bethlehem, Pennsylvania, the son of Russell W. Davenport Sr., a vice president of Bethlehem Steel, and Cornelia Whipple Farnum. His younger brother was John Davenport, also a journalist.

He served with the U.S. Army in World War I and received the Croix de Guerre. He enrolled at Yale University and graduated in 1923, where he was classmate of Henry Luce and Briton Hadden, who founded Time. While at Yale, he became a member of the secret society Skull and Bones.

Career
Davenport joined the editorial staff of Fortune in 1930 and became managing editor in 1937. At Fortune, he helped create the first Fortune 500 list.

In 1940, he turned to politics and became a personal and political advisor to Wendell Willkie.  Willkie was the Republican nominee for the 1940 presidential election and lost the election to Franklin D. Roosevelt. After Willkie's death in 1944, Davenport became a de facto leader of the internationalist Republicans.

Following World War II, he was on the staff of Life and Time until 1952. In 1944, Simon and Schuster published one of his works, "My Country, A Poem of America". His book The Dignity of Man was published posthumously in 1955.

Personal life
In 1929, he married the writer Marcia Davenport; they divorced in 1944.

References

1899 births
1954 deaths
American magazine publishers (people)
Yale University alumni
Writers from Bethlehem, Pennsylvania
Fortune (magazine) people
Pennsylvania Republicans
United States Army personnel of World War I